Maliha Ali Asghar Khan is a Pakistani politician from Mansehra District, belong to Pakistan Tehreek-e-Insaf who had been member of the Provincial Assembly of Khyber Pakhtunkhwa from August 2018 until January 2023. She also served as a member of different committees.
She is the wife of Pakistan Tehreek-e-Insaf's leader from Abbottabad, Ali Asghar Khan and daughter in law of Air Marshal Asghar Khan

Political career
Maliha was elected as the member of the Khyber Pakhtunkhwa Assembly on ticket of Pakistan Tehreek-e-Insaf from Constituency WR-05 in 2013 Pakistani general election.

She was re-elected to the Provincial Assembly of Khyber Pakhtunkhwa as a candidate of PTI on a reserved seat for women in 2018 Pakistani general election.

References

Living people
Pashtun women
Khyber Pakhtunkhwa MPAs 2013–2018
People from Mansehra District
Pakistan Tehreek-e-Insaf MPAs (Khyber Pakhtunkhwa)
Year of birth missing (living people)